Sporosarcina contaminans is a Gram-positive and endospore-forming bacterium from the genus of Sporosarcina which has been isolated from an industrial clean-room floor from Göteborg in Sweden.

References 

Bacillales
Bacteria described in 2010